Salem City School District may refer to:

Salem City School District (New Jersey), Salem County, New Jersey
Salem City School District, Ohio, Salem, Ohio